Haroldiataenius convexus is a species of aphodiine dung beetle in the family Scarabaeidae. It is found in North America.

References

Further reading

 

Scarabaeidae
Articles created by Qbugbot
Beetles described in 1940